Charles C. Davis (August 15, 1830 – January 20, 1909) was a United States Army Medal of Honor recipient, honored for his actions in command of the 7th Pennsylvania Cavalry during the Battle of Hoover's Gap of the American Civil War.

Biography
Davis was born in Harrisburg, Pennsylvania in August 1830. He joined the Army from Harrisburg in September 1861, and was discharged in September 1864. He is one of two recipients of the Civil War Medal of Honor from Dauphin County, Pennsylvania. He is interred at Harrisburg Cemetery.

Army service during the Civil War
Davis attained the rank of major of the 7th Pennsylvania Cavalry in July 1863. He was present at the Battle of Hoover's Gap, the principal battle fought in the Tullahoma Campaign (also known as the Middle Tennessee Campaign), of the American Civil War. He received the Medal of Honor for his actions at Shelbyville, Tennessee on June 27, 1863. The citation read: Led one of the most desperate and successful charges of the war. Date of issue: June 1894.

Medal of Honor citation
Rank and organization: Major, 7th Pennsylvania Cavalry. Place and date: At Shelbyville, Tenn., June 27, 1863. Entered service at: Harrisburg, Pa. Born: August 15, 1830, Harrisburg, Pa. Date of issue: June 14, 1894.

Citation:

Led one of the most desperate and successful charges of the war.

See also

List of Medal of Honor recipients
List of American Civil War Medal of Honor recipients: A–F

Notes

References

External links

1830 births
1909 deaths
Burials at Harrisburg Cemetery
United States Army Medal of Honor recipients
Union Army officers
United States Army officers
People from Harrisburg, Pennsylvania
American Civil War recipients of the Medal of Honor
Military personnel from Pennsylvania